In chemical graph theory, the Estrada index is a topological index of protein folding. The index was first defined by Ernesto Estrada as a measure of the degree of folding of a protein, which is represented as a path-graph weighted by the dihedral or torsional angles of the protein backbone. This index of degree of folding has found multiple applications in the study of protein functions and protein-ligand interactions.

The name "Estrada index" was introduced by de la Peña et al. in 2007.

Derivation

Let  be a graph of size  and let  be a non-increasing ordering of the eigenvalues of its adjacency matrix . The Estrada index is defined as

 
 
For a general graph, the index can be obtained as the sum of the subgraph centralities of all nodes in the graph. The subgraph centrality of node  is defined as

 
 
The subgraph centrality has the following closed form

 
 
where   is the  th entry of the  th eigenvector associated with the eigenvalue . It is straightforward to realise that

References

Mathematical chemistry
Cheminformatics
Graph invariants